Day Forest National Park, also known as Forêt du Day National Park, is a national park in the Goda Mountains and Tadjourah Region of Djibouti.

Flora

Along with Mount Mabla, the Forêt du Day National Park is one of Djibouti's two remnant areas of closed−protected forests. It protects an important forest island in a sea of semi-desert.

It has four dominant tree species: Juniperus procera, Olea africana, Buxus hildebrandtii, and Tarchonanthus camphoratus. Doum Palms are found in the western part of the plain of Hanle, at the foot of Gamarré on the edge of the plain of Gagadé. The vegetation becomes more abundant with altitude. Thus the set of Day and its extension to the crest of Goda are occupied by an ancient juniper forest, ficus, mimosa, wild olive trees, boxwood, dragon trees, and other native plants.

This is the largest forest in Djibouti. The forest has a total area of approximately 14500 acres. The most valuable part of national park is 2223 acres large stand of East African junipers Juniperus procera which grows in the heights above 950 m. Junipers here reach height of 20 m, but many trees have died off in recent decades, while the boxwood B. hildebrandtii is expanding in their stead.

Fauna
Notable animals found here include the Djibouti spurfowl (Pternistis ochropectus), a population of green-winged pytilia that may actually be a distinct species or subspecies (Pytilia (melba) flavicaudata), as well as the mysterious and undescribed Tôha sunbird—Djibouti sunbird (Chalcomitra sp. indet.). All of these birds do not occur outside of and are endemic to Djibouti, and except for the Francolin they have only ever been found within Day Forest.

More widespread birds inhabiting the forest are Gambaga flycatcher (Muscicapa gambagae), Somali bulbul (Pycnonotus (barbatus) somaliensis) and Somali starling (Onychognathus blythii).

The rare colubrid snake Platyceps afarensis is also found here.

Conservation
The forest as a whole has been under long-term environmental threat. 88% of the Day Forest has been lost over the last two centuries, and more than 20% of the loss has occurred during the last 50 years.

References

External links
DjiboutiWildlife.org: Flora and forestry of the Day Forest

National parks of Djibouti
Afromontane forests
Tadjourah Region
Protected areas established in 1939
1939 establishments in Africa